This is a partial list of notable Philippine Military Academy alumni.

List
 Silvino Gallardo, 1913
 Paulino Santos, 1914 - AFP Chief of Staff (1936)
 Vicente Lim, 1914 (USMA '14) - CG, 41st Philippine Division
 Ruperto Kangleon, 1914, PA - 6th Secretary of National Defense; Senator

 Eulogio Balao, 1931 - Senator; 10th Secretary of National Defense; AFP Vice Chief of Staff

 Pelagio A. Cruz, 1935 - AFP Chief of Staff
 Emilio S. Liwanag, 1935, PN
 Francisco R. Adriano Sr., 1937 - Presidential Saber Awardee, Brigadier General
 Ernesto S. Mata, 1937, PA - 15th Secretary of Defense; AFP Chief of Staff (1963-1964)
 Alfredo E. Gallardo - 1937
 Manuel Yan, 1941 longest continuous government service 1937-2001, Youngest AFP Chief of Staff at age 48 years old and cabinet member for nine years
 Rafael Ileto, 1943 - 17th Secretary of National Defense; AFP Vice Chief of Staff; Ambassador to Iran (1975-1979)
 Fidel Ramos, 1951, (USMA '50) - President of the Philippines; 18th Secretary of National Defense; AFP Chief of Staff; Chief of the Philippine Constabulary (1972 – February 25, 1986)
 Fortunato Abat, 1951 - 20th Secretary of National Defense; Commanding General of the Philippine Army
 Jose T. Almonte, 1956 - National Security Advisor (Philippines); Vice Chief of Staff for Civil Relations
 Renato De Villa, 1957 - PMA Commandant; AFP Chief of Staff; 19th Secretary of National Defense; Executive Secretary 2001 to 2005
 Eduardo Ermita, 1957 - AFP Vice Chief of Staff; AFP Deputy Chief of Staff; 22nd Secretary of National Defense
 Marcelo Blando, 1960
 Rodolfo Biazon, 1961 - Senator; AFP Chief of Staff; AFP Vice Chief of Staff; Commandant of the Philippine Marines; Superintendent, PMA; CG, NCRDC
 Angelo Reyes, 1966, PA - Secretary DOE, DENR, DILG, Ambassador at Large; Chief of Staff, AFP; CG Philippine Army; CG, Southcom; 23rd Secretary of National Defense
 Voltaire Gazmin, 1968 - 35th Secretary of National Defense (appointed July 1, 2010); Philippines Ambassador to Cambodia (2002-2004); Commanding General of the Philippine Army; Commander of Presidential Security Group (1986-1992)
 Reynaldo Wycoco, 1968 - National Bureau of Investigation Director (2001-2005)
 Proceso L. Maligalig, 1969, PN - President, Bataan Shipyard and Engineering Company (BASECO); President Emeritus, Rebolusyonaryong Alyansang Makabansa (RAM)
 Jaime de los Santos, 1969 PA - CG Philippine Army (2001-2002)
 Hermogenes E. Ebdane, Jr., 1970 - PNP Chief, National Security Advisor, 30th Secretary of National Defense, Secretary of Public Works & Highways
 Gregorio Honasan, 1971 - Senator
 Panfilo Lacson, 1971 - PDGen PNP, Senator
 Edgar Aglipay, 1971 - NCRPO commander for two terms, PNP chief
 Ariston Delos Reyes, 1971 - AFP Vice Chief of Staff; AFP Deputy Chief of Staff; Vice Commander, PN; Deputy Chief of Staff for Plans, J5, GHQ; Chief of Naval Staff, Headquarters, PN
 Victor Batac, 1971 - PNP Director of Logistics
 Rodolfo Aguinaldo, 1972, PA - Congressman 6th District Cagayan, Governor Cagayan (see 1986–1990 Philippine coup attempts#March 1990 coup attempt)
 Ernesto H. De Leon, 1972 - AFP - FOIC, PN; Philippine Ambassador to Australia
 Delfin Lorenzana, 1973, PA - Secretary of the Department of National Defense
 Cardozo M. Luna, 1975 - Undersecretary of Department of National Defense; former Philippine Ambassador to the Netherlands; former Vice Chief of Staff and Lieutenant General of the Armed Forces of the Philippines
 Noe Wong, 1975, PNP - Ambassador to Cambodia
 Leopoldo N. Bataoil, 1976, PNP - Congressman Pangasinan 2nd district (since 2010)
 Rodrigo F. Maclang, 1976 - AFP Deputy Chief of Staff
 Alexander B. Yano, 1976, PA - 38th AFP Chief of Staff; 49th CG Philippine Army (2007-2008)
 Leopoldo L. Maligalig, 1976, PA - Superintendent, Philippine Military Academy; Lopez Group of Companies 
 Ricardo David, 1977, PA - AFP Chief of Staff
 Nestor Ochoa, 1977, PA - Philippine Ambassador to Brunei (since 2011)
 Delfin Bangit, 1978, PA - AFP Chief of Staff
 Arturo Ortiz, 1979, PA - Medal of Valor Awardee; 53rd CG Philippine Army (since 2010)
 Ariel Q. Querubin, 1979, PMC - Medal of Valor Awardee; CG 1st Marine Brigade 
 Natalio C. Ecarma III, - 1981, Undersecretary of National Defense for Defense Operations. 1st Filipino Head of Mission and Force Commander of a United Nations Peacekeeping Force; Force Recon Marines 
 Donato B. San Juan II, 1984, PA - Superintendent, Philippine Military Academy; Former Deputy Commissioner, Bureau of Customs
 Rey Leonardo Guerrero, 1984, PA - 49th Chief of Staff of the Armed Forces of the Philippines; Commissioner, Bureau of Customs
 Salvador Melchor B. Mison Jr, 1984, PAF - Vice Chief of Staff, Armed Forces of the Philippines
 Carlito Galvez Jr., 1985, PA - 50th Chief of Staff of the Armed Forces of the Philippines; Secretary, Office of the Presidential Adviser on the Peace Process (OPAPP); Chief Implementer, National Task Force Against COVID-19
 Gilbert I. Gapay, 1986, PA - 55th Chairman of the Joint Chiefs
 Ronald dela Rosa, 1986 - 19th Chief of the Philippine National Police, Senator
 Oscar David Albayalde, 1986 - 20th Chief of the Philippine National Police 
 Cirilito E. Sobejana, PA, 1987 - Medal of Valor Awardee, 56th Chairman of the Joint Chiefs
 Debold Sinas, 1987 - 23rd Chief of the Philippine National Police
Guillermo Eleazar, 1987 - 24th Chief of the Philippine National Police
 Herbert Dilag, 1998 PA - Medal of Valor Awardee

Notable Philippine Military Academy classes 
Several Philippine Military Academy classes have achieved notability, either due to highly decorated class members, significant changes in the PMA curriculum, or due to a high proportion of officers elevated to the highest ranks of the Armed Forces of the Philippines or the Philippine National Police.

These include:

"Magiting" Class of 1970 - the first class with a recorded formal name; included Zambales Gov. Hermogenes Ebdane Jr., former Armed Forces of the Philippines Chief of Staff Roy Cimatu.

"Matatag" Class of 1971 - best known for being the core group of the Reform the Armed Forces Movement (RAM); included Senators Gregorio Honasan and Panfilo Lacson; also included former Maj. Gen. Carlos Garcia, who was later implicated in a military fund scandal.

"Dimalupig" Class of 1981 - well known as having many "mistahs" appointed to high ranks during the term of President Benigno Aquino III, incouding four who achieved four-star rank: AFP chief General Gregorio Catapang Jr; PNP chief Director General Alan Purisima; Retired AFP chief General Emmanuel Bautista; and Thai officer Thawip Poonsiri Netniyom, who was valedictorian and would become General the Royal Thai Armed Forces.

"Sinagtala" Class of 1986 - known for being the first class to graduate from the PMA after the restoration of Philippine democracy in 1986, and the first batch of new military officers to serve the administration of the late President Corazon Aquino; also known for having many "mistahs" appointed to high ranks during the term of President Rodrigo Duterte, including most of the heads of the PNP: Ronald dela Rosa, Oscar Albayalde, Francisco Gamboa, and Camilo Cascolan.

"Maalab" Class of 1993 - known for being the class of environmental martyr Philip Pestaño; was also the last PMA class to graduate before the inclusion of women, later in the same year.

"Kalasag-lahi" Class of 1997 - known for being the class that saw the graduation of PMA's first batch of women graduates

"Marilag" Class of 1995 - known for being the class of many of Magdalo group during the Oakwood mutiny, including Antonio Trillanes but also Makati Police Chief PSSupt. Rogelio Simon, who served Trillanes' warrant of arrest in 2018. It is notable academically as the class who were first to undergo the new tri-service curriculum of PMA, effectively becoming PMA's first batch of service specialists upon graduation.

Gallery

References

Philippine Military Academy